Lithuania competed at the 1996 Summer Olympics in Atlanta, United States.

Medalists

Athletics

Men
Track & road events

Field events

Women
Track & road events

Field events

Combined events – Heptathlon

Basketball

Men's tournament

Team Roster
Gintaras Einikis
Artūras Karnišovas
Rimas Kurtinaitis
Darius Lukminas
Šarūnas Marčiulionis
Tomas Pačėsas
Arvydas Sabonis
Saulius Štombergas
Rytis Vaišvila
Eurelijus Žukauskas
Mindaugas Žukauskas
Preliminary round

Quarterfinals

Semifinals

Bronze medal game

Boxing

Men

Canoeing

Sprint
Men

Cycling

Road
Men

Women

Track
Sprint

Pursuit

Points

Gymnastics

Rhythmic gymnastics

Judo

Men

Modern Pentathlon

One male pentathlete represented Lithuania in 1992.

Rowing

Men

Women

Shooting

Women

Swimming

Men

Women

Table Tennis

Singles

Weightlifting

Men

Wrestling

Men's Greco-Roman

Men's Freestyle

References

sports-reference

Nations at the 1996 Summer Olympics
1996
1996 in Lithuanian sport